Finlandia-Ajo ("Finlandia Race") is an annual Group One harness event that takes place at Vermo Racetrack in Espoo, Finland. The competition, which was inaugurated in 1980, is regarded as Finland's biggest trotting event. It is raced over the mile, 1,609 meters. Finlandia-Ajo is part of the European Grand Circuit and the overall purse for the 2009 event was €190,000, equalling approximately US$247,000.

Racing conditions
Finlandia-Ajo is decided through a one-mile race. The first eight years (1980-1987), the race was over a slightly shorter distance (1,600 meters, 0.99 mile), but since 1988, the distance has been one mile. The race has always been started by the use of auto start.

Past winners

Horses with most wins
 2 - Giesolo de Lou (1999, 2000)
 2 - Napoletano (1988, 1989)

Drivers with most wins
 4 - Jean-Michel Bazire (2005, 2008, 2009, 2011)
 3 - Stig H. Johansson (1988, 1989, 2004)
 3 - Jorma Kontio (1985, 1986, 2007)
 2 - Olle Goop (1983, 1987)
 2 - Joseph Verbeeck (1998, 2003)
 2 - Björn Goop (2010, 2012)

Trainers with most wins
 4 - Fabrice Souloy (2003, 2008, 2009, 2011)
 3 - Olle Goop (1983, 1987, 2010)
 2 - Jean-Etienne Dubois (1999, 2000)
 2 - Stig Engberg (1988, 1989)

Sires with most winning offsprings
 2 - Biesolo (Giesolo de Lou, Oiseau de Feux)
 2 - Quick Pay (Atas Fighter L., Born Quick)
 2 - Texas (Grades Singing, Copiad)
 2 - Super Bowl (Davidia Hanover, Napoletano)

Countries, number of wins
 11 - 
 10 - 
 9 - 
 4 - 
 1 -

All winners of Finlandia-Ajo

See also
 List of Scandinavian harness horse races

References

Harness races in Finland